The 326th Fighter-Interceptor Squadron is an inactive United States Air Force unit.  Its last assignment was with the 328th Fighter Wing at Richards-Gebaur Air Force Base, Missouri, where it was inactivated on 2 January 1967.

History

World War II
It was first activated as the 326th Fighter Squadron and served as an air defense and operational training unit until 1 March 1944, and then a replacement training unit until 31 March 1944.

Air Defense Command

The squadron was redesignated the 326th Fighter-Interceptor Squadron and activated in 1953 to provide air defense of the midwest United States from 1953 to 1967.  The 326th flew radar equipped and Mighty Mouse rocket armed North American F-86D Sabre aircraft. The 326th Squadron upgraded to Convair F-102 Delta Dagger aircraft, armed with AIM-4 Falcon Air-to-air missiles by June 1957.

From 18 December 1953 – 1 March 1954, the 326th Fighter-Interceptor Squadron was assigned to Fairfax Field, Kansas, and an F-84 crashed near the city's business district killing the pilot and three residents.

On 22 October 1962, before President John F. Kennedy told Americans that missiles were in place in Cuba, the squadron dispersed one third of its force, equipped with nuclear tipped missiles to Central Nebraska Regional Airport at the start of the Cuban Missile Crisis. These planes returned to Richards-Gebaur after the crisis.

However, Starting on 19 December 1962, the squadron established a detachment of fighters at Homestead Air Force Base, Florida.  This operation ended on 15 February 1963. For one year, a similar detachment was established at Naval Air Station Key West, Florida, from 1 August 1965 until 1 July 1966. From 1966 until inactivation, the 326th maintained a detachment at Grand Island Municipal Airport, Nebraska.

Lineage
 Constituted as the 326th Fighter Squadron on 24 June 1942
 Activated on 10 July 1942
 Disbanded on 31 March 1944
 Reconstituted, and redesignated 326th Fighter-Interceptor Squadron on 23 March 1953
 Activated on 18 December 1953
 Inactivated on 2 January 1967

Assignments
 328th Fighter Group, 10 July 1942 – 31 March 1944
 4676th Air Defense Group, 18 December 1953
 328th Fighter Group, 18 August 1955
 328th Fighter Wing, 1 February 1961 – 2 January 1967

Stations
 Hamilton Field, California, 10 July 1942
 Santa Rosa Army Air Field, California, 13 December 1943 – 31 March 1944
 Fairfax Field, Kansas, 18 December 1953
 Grandview (later Richards-Gebaur) Air Force Base, Missouri, 1 March 1954 – 2 January 1967

Aircraft
 Bell P-39 Airacobra, 1942–1944
 North American F-86D Sabre, 1953–1957
 Convair F-102 Delta Dagger, 1957–1967

See also

References

Notes

Bibliography

 
 
 McMullen, Richard F. (1964) "The Fighter Interceptor Force 1962–1964"  ADC Historical Study No. 27, Air Defense Command, Ent Air Force Base, CO (Confidential, declassified 22 March 2000)
 NORAD/CONAD Participation in the Cuban Missile Crisis, Historical Reference Paper No. 8, Directorate of Command History Continental Air Defense Command, Ent AFB, CO, 1 Feb 63 (Top Secret NOFORN declassified 9 March 1996)
 "ADCOM's Fighter Interceptor Squadrons". The Interceptor (January 1979) Aerospace Defense Command, (Volume 21, Number 1)

External links

Fighter squadrons of the United States Air Force
Military units and formations established in 1953